Andrew Salter may refer to:

Andrew Salter (psychologist) (1914–1996), American psychotherapist
Andrew Salter (cricketer) (born 1993), Welsh cricketer